The 1939 UCI Track Cycling World Championships were the World Championship for track cycling. They took place in Milan, Italy from 26 August to 3 September 1939. Two events for men were contested, one for professionals and one for amateurs.

Medal summary

Medal table

References

Track cycling
UCI Track Cycling World Championships by year
International cycle races hosted by Italy
Sports competitions in Milan
1939 in track cycling
1930s in Milan